The 2010 Formula BMW Europe season was the third and final season of the Formula BMW Europe championship. The championship began on 8 May at Barcelona and finished on 12 September at Monza. The series was axed at the end of the season, in favour of a new Formula BMW Talent Cup starting in 2011.

The season was dominated by two drivers in their second season of competing in the championship, Robin Frijns of Josef Kaufmann Racing and Jack Harvey of Fortec Motorsport. Heading into the final round at Monza, Harvey held a seven-point lead over Frijns, but after taking pole position for both races, Harvey's chances took a hit after Javier Tarancón tried to outbrake him into the final corner and collided with him. Frijns won the race, and then a third place for him in the final race to Harvey's victory allowed the Kaufmann driver to claim the championship by eleven points, despite taking six wins to Harvey's seven, with both drivers taking thirteen podiums.

Third place was just as hotly contested, between Mücke Motorsport's Timmy Hansen and EuroInternational's Carlos Sainz Jr. which like the main championship battle, was not settled until the final rounds of the season. Hansen, the son of multiple championship-winning rallycross driver Kenneth, had finished thirteenth in the previous season due to his team being disqualified from two meetings due to a technical infringement, but improved in his second season in the class which included a victory at Hockenheim. Sainz, the son of former double World Rally Champion Carlos Sainz, finished thirteen points behind in fourth having taken a single victory during the season, winning at Silverstone. The season's other victory was taken by Tarancón at Spa-Francorchamps en route to a fifth place championship finish. The Teams' Championship was won by Josef Kaufmann Racing ahead of Fortec Motorsport.

Teams and drivers
 The entry list for the series was released on 2 March 2010. All cars were Mygale FB02 chassis powered by BMW engines. Guest drivers in italics.

Calendar
 The calendar for the 2010 season was announced on 17 December 2009.

Standings

Drivers
Points were awarded as follows:

† — Drivers did not finish the race, but were classified as they completed over 90% of the race distance.

Teams

References

External links
 BMW-Motorsport.com

Formula BMW seasons
Formula BMW Europe season
Formula BMW Europe
BMW Europe